SpareBank 1 Østfold Akershus is a Norwegian savings bank, headquartered in Moss, Norway. The banks main
market is Østfold and Akershus. The history of the bank can be traced back to 1835.

References

Banks of Norway
SpareBank 1
Companies based in Østfold
Banks established in 2011
Companies listed on the Oslo Stock Exchange